Victoria Redel (born 1959) is an American poet and fiction writer who lives in New York City. She is the author of five books of fiction: Before Everything, Make Me Do Things, The Border of Truth, Loverboy and Where the Road Bottoms Out and four books of poetry: 'Paradise,'Woman Without Umbrella, Swoon, and Already the World. She has taught at Columbia University, Vermont College and is currently on the faculty of Sarah Lawrence College. She has two sons.

Awards and honors
Redel has received awards in fiction and poetry including fellowships from the Guggenheim Foundation, The National Endowment for the Arts, the Fine Arts Work Center. She won the Tom and Stan Wick Poetry award for Already the World and the S. Mariela Gable Award for Loverboy. Swoon was a finalist for the James Laughlin Award.

Her novel Loverboy was a Los Angeles Best Book. The novel was adapted for a feature-length film (Loverboy, 2006) directed by Kevin Bacon and starring Kyra Sedgwick. Other actors in the film include Oliver Platt, Marisa Tomei, Matt Dillon, and Sandra Bullock.

Background
Redel is a first generation American born into a Jewish family of Belgian-Polish, Romanian and Egyptian descent. Her mother, Natalie Soltanitzky, a noted ballet teacher and Director of the Ballet Guild School of Westchester, was born in Romania, coming to New York in 1942 after spending two years in Paris under German Occupation. Her father, Irving Redel, left Belgium in 1940. He and his parents were among the 86 passengers on the ship the Quanza who were initially refused entry into the United States and Mexico and were about to be returned to Lisbon. The situation of the Quanza became the setting for Redel’s novel The Border of Truth. Victoria Redel is the youngest of three daughters. She grew up in Scarsdale, New York, is a graduate of Dartmouth College and received an MFA in poetry from Columbia University.

For her short-story collection Make Me Do Things'', which was released in 2013, she had a cinematic book trailer produced.

Notes

External links

Bombsite.com
Ontheinside.com
smallspiralnotebook.com

1959 births
Living people
Sarah Lawrence College faculty
Columbia University staff
20th-century American novelists
21st-century American novelists
American women novelists
American women poets
American people of Romanian-Jewish descent
American people of Belgian-Jewish descent
American people of Polish-Jewish descent
American people of Egyptian-Jewish descent
People from Scarsdale, New York
Dartmouth College alumni
Columbia University School of the Arts alumni
Writers from New York City
20th-century American women writers
21st-century American women writers
20th-century American poets
21st-century American poets
Scarsdale High School alumni
Novelists from New York (state)
American women academics